Florida Airport may refer to:

 Florida Airport (Bolivia) in Florida, Velasco province, Santa Cruz department, Bolivia (ICAO: SLFL)
 Florida Airport (Cuba) in Florida, Camagüey province, Cuba (ICAO: MUFL)

See also
 List of airports in Florida (United States)